Orlen Arena is an indoor arena in Płock, Poland. It opened on 13 November 2010, and holds 5,492 people.

It is located the Celebra Papieska Square, adjacent to Kazimierz Górski Stadium and is primarily used for handball, volleyball, basketball, tennis, table tennis, mixed martial arts, popular music and concerts.

Capacity 
Permanent seating includes 5,029 places, a set of VIP lounges with 224 places, a journalist area with 100 places and another 28 places for the handicapped.
Temporary seating for an additional 111 places can also be installed. The total capacity of the arena is 5492 places.

Events

Handball
The arena is the permanent home of the Wisła Płock. It will also be the host of the President's Cup for 2023 World Men's Handball Championship.

MMA
The arena has hosted a number of KSW mixed martial arts events.

Music

Jean-Michel Jarre played at the inauguration of arena on 13 November 2010.

References

Indoor arenas in Poland
Buildings and structures in Płock
Sports venues in Masovian Voivodeship
Handball venues in Poland